Kiran McDonald Seran (born 11 January 1994) is a Scottish rugby union player. He plays as a lock.

Rugby union career

Amateur career
McDonald has played for Glasgow Academicals, Glasgow Hawks, Hull and Currie at an amateur level.

Professional career

McDonald played for Glasgow Warriors against Canada 'A' on 30 August 2016 in a 63–0 win for the Warriors at Bridgehaugh Park, Stirling. He re-joined with the Warriors on 5 May 2017 for the 2017–18 season. He made his competitive debut for the Warriors away against the Ospreys in the Pro14 on 26 November 2017. He started the match which ended in a 7-try demolition of the Welsh side.

McDonald moved to Wasps ahead of the 2022–23 season but was made redundant on 17 October 2022 along with all other players and coaching staff when Wasps entered administration. He subsequently joined Irish United Rugby Championship club Munster on a three-month contract as injury cover in late October 2022, and made his senior competitive debut for the province when he started in their historic 28–14 win against a South Africa XV in Páirc Uí Chaoimh on 10 November 2022. McDonald departed the province upon the completion of his three-month contract at the end of January 2023.

International career

McDonald was called up to the Scotland squad for the 2021 summer internationals. He played for the Barbarians in their 31–30 win against Bath on 20 November 2022.

Outside of rugby
In 2012, as an RAF cadet, McDonald Seran won the Kriegie Trophy. The trophy is awarded to the cadet who, in the opinion of the officers, is the best of the air cadets to attend the course in that particular year. A motion was lodged in the Scottish Parliament by his local SNP MSP, Fiona McLeod, to congratulate McDonald's achievement.

References

External links
Glasgow Warriors Profile
Glasgow Hawks Profile
All Rugby Profile
It's Rugby Profile
Munster Profile

1994 births
Living people
Rugby union players from Glasgow
Scottish rugby union players
Glasgow Hawks players
Glasgow Academicals rugby union players
Currie RFC players
Glasgow Warriors players
Wasps RFC players
Munster Rugby players
Barbarian F.C. players
Scottish expatriate rugby union players
Rugby union locks